Irala is a surname of Basque origin. Notable people with the surname include:

Adriano Irala (1894-1933), Paraguayan professor and journalist
Blas Irala (born 1983), Paraguayan footballer
Casimiro Abdon Irala Arguello (born 1936), Brazilian Jesuit priest and musician
Domingo Martínez de Irala (1509-1556), Spanish conquistador
Pedro Richard Irala (born 1979), Paraguayan footballer
Severiano Irala (died 2012), Paraguayan footballer

References

Basque-language surnames